Repent at Leisure is a 1941 American domestic comedy film directed by Frank Woodruff from a screenplay by Jerry Cady based on a story by James Gow and Arnaud D'Usseau. Produced and distributed by RKO Radio Pictures, the film was released on April 4, 1941, and stars Kent Taylor, Wendy Barrie, and George Barbier.

Plot summary

Cast
 Kent Taylor - Richard Hughes
 Wendy Barrie - Emily Baldwin
 George Barbier - Robert Cornelius 'R.C.' Baldwin
 Thurston Hall - Jay Buckingham
 Charles Lane - Clarence Morgan
 Nella Walker - Mrs. Sally Baldwin
 Rafael Storm - Prince Paul Stephanie
 Ruth Dietrich - Miss Flynn
 Cecil Cunningham - Mrs. Morgan
 George Chandler - Bus Conductor

References

External links
 
 
 
 

1941 films
American black-and-white films
RKO Pictures films
1941 comedy films
American comedy films
Films produced by Cliff Reid
1940s English-language films
Films directed by Frank Woodruff
1940s American films